This is a list of the Lord Mayors of the City of Manchester in the North West of England. Not to be confused with the Directly elected Greater Manchester Mayor.

The Current and 124th Lord Mayor is Cllr Donna Ludford, Labour who has served Since May 2022, and was elected Councillor for the Ancoats and Clayton ward in 2013 and following boundary changes became Councillor for Clayton and Openshaw.

The Lord Mayor position, is selected by a vote of councillors, and is a Ceremonial role, with the holder attending civic events, promoting chosen causes and chairing meetings of Manchester City Council, while acting as a city Ambassador.  The Lord Mayor’s term lasts for one year, and a new Lord Mayor Is elected in a full council meeting, usually in May.

History

Manchester was incorporated in 1838 under the Municipal Corporations Act 1835 as the Corporation of Manchester or Manchester Corporation.  It achieved city status in 1853, only the second such grant since the Reformation. The area included in the city has been increased many times, in 1885 (Bradford, Harpurhey and Rusholme), 1890 (Blackley, Crumpsall, part of Droylsden, Kirkmanshulme, Moston, Newton Heath, Openshaw, and West Gorton), 1903 (Heaton), 1904 (Burnage, Chorlton cum Hardy, Didsbury, and Moss Side), 1909 (Gorton, and Levenshulme), 1931 (Wythenshawe: Baguley, Northenden, and  Etchells), and Ringway. A new town hall was opened in 1877 (by Alderman Abel Heywood) and the then-current and future mayors of Manchester were granted the title of Lord Mayor in 1893. Anthony Marshall was the last mayor and the first lord mayor.

In 1984, the city council – at that time controlled by the left-leaning Labour party – voted to reduce the pomp and rate-payer cost associated with the position, changing the title to Chair of the Manchester City Council (often shortened), following the lead of some Greater London boroughs. This change dispensed with the elaborate robes and chain of office (a gilded ornament worn on the shoulders and around the neck), and no longer provided the traditional tax-funded, eight-room apartment for the officeholder to live in (instead opening this fancy traditional residence to the public as a tourist attraction). These changes were unpopular in the area, especially after focused agitation against them by the Manchester Evening News, which labelled them a political move originated by non-local leftist activists.  The title Lord Mayor continued to be used frequently, especially outside the city council.  The first of the three successive chairs of council was Kenneth Strath in the 1985–1986 term, and the last was Eileen Kelly, 1987–1988, Later officeholders were referred to again as lord mayors consistently, and permitted to use the traditional vestments associated with the office. Today, Vestments have returned and the title Lord Mayor is used.

Mayors of Manchester

1838–1893

Lord mayors of Manchester

19th century

20th century

21st century

See also
 List of mayors of Manchester, New Hampshire
 Mayor of Greater Manchester, England

References

External links

The Lord Mayor's Office (official website)

Mayors of Manchester
Councillors in Manchester
Local government in Manchester
Lists of mayors of places in England
Lord Mayors of Manchester
Lord Mayor of Manchester